Northop Hall Country House Hotel is country house, now run as a hotel in Flintshire, just south of Northop Hall, northeastern Wales. The estate is set in 9 acres with a tree-lined driveway. The original manor here was built in the 13th century.  It was occupied by local aristocracy including the Evans family, ancestors of author George Eliot. The original Northop Hall is now a private house.

The country house which currently exists was built on a different spot in 1872. The interior is elegant, with a Canadian pine staircase, 38 bedrooms, and four conference style rooms, including The Garden, Terrace, Gallery and Library Rooms.

References

Hotels in Wales
Country houses in Wales
Houses completed in 1872
Buildings and structures in Flintshire